Anna Matiyenko (born 12 July 1981 in Prokhladny, Kabardino-Balkarian Republic) is a Russian volleyball player. At the 2012 Summer Olympics, she competed for the Russia women's national volleyball team in the women's event.

References

External links
 
 
 

1981 births
Living people
People from Prokhladny, Kabardino-Balkar Republic
Russian women's volleyball players
Olympic volleyball players of Russia
Volleyball players at the 2012 Summer Olympics
Volleyball players at the 2015 European Games
European Games competitors for Russia
Sportspeople from Kabardino-Balkaria
20th-century Russian women
21st-century Russian women